The Brazilian women's national 3x3 team represents Brazil in international 3x3 basketball matches and is controlled by the Confederação Brasileira de Basketball (Brazilian Basketball Confederation) – abbreviated as CBB.

World Cup record

See also 
 3x3 basketball
 Brazil women's national basketball (full court) team
 Brazil men's national 3x3 team

References

External links 
 

3x3
Women's national 3x3 basketball teams
3x3
Basketball in Brazil